The 2018–19 Texas A&M Aggies women's basketball team represented Texas A&M University in the 2018–19 NCAA Division I women's basketball season. The team's head coach is Gary Blair, in his sixteenth season at Texas A&M. The team played their home games at the Reed Arena in College Station, Texas and was in its seventh season as a member of the Southeastern Conference. They finished the season with a record of 26-8 (12-4 SEC). They advanced to the semifinals of the SEC Women's Tournament where they were upset by Arkansas. They received an at-large bid to the NCAA Women's Tournament where they defeated Wright State and Marquette in the first and second rounds, before losing to Notre Dame in the Sweet Sixteen for the 2nd straight year.

Previous season
The Aggies finished the 2017–18 season 26–10, 11–5 in SEC play to finish in a four-way tie for fourth place. They advanced to the semifinals of the SEC women's tournament where they lost to Mississippi State. They received an at-large bid to the NCAA women's basketball tournament where they defeated Drake and DePaul in the first and second rounds before losing to Notre Dame in the sweet sixteen.

Roster

Rankings

^Coaches' Poll did not release a second poll at the same time as the AP.

Schedule

|-
!colspan=6 style=| Exhibition

|-
!colspan=6 style=| Non-Conference Games

|-
!colspan=6 style=| SEC Conference Games

|-
!colspan=9 style=| SEC Women's Tournament

|-
!colspan=9 style=| NCAA Women's Tournament

See also
 2018–19 Texas A&M Aggies men's basketball team

References

Texas A&M Aggies women's basketball seasons
Texas AandM
Texas AandM Aggies women's basketball
Texas AandM Aggies women's basketball
Texas AandM